The following is a List of German ministers, envoys and ambassadors to Japan

Sources
 Nihon Kingendaishi Jiten, "Dictionary of Modern and Present Japanese History" (Tôyô Keizai Shinpôsha, 1978)
 Nihon Gaikoshi Jiten, "Dictionary of Japanese Diplomatic History" (Tokyo: Yamakawa Shuppansha, 1992)
 Website of the German embassy in Japan
 Website of the Japanese embassy in Germany

See also
 Japanese Ministers, Envoys and Ambassadors to Germany
 Germany–Japan relations
 Diplomatic rank

Japan
German